Maurice Graham (12 August 1902 – 26 February 1993) was a New Zealand cricketer. He played in nine first-class matches for Canterbury from 1934 to 1937.

See also
 List of Canterbury representative cricketers

References

External links
 

1902 births
1993 deaths
New Zealand cricketers
Canterbury cricketers
People from Leeston
Cricketers from Canterbury, New Zealand